Walker Library may refer to:

David S. Walker Library in Tallahassee, Florida, USA
James E. Walker Library at the Middle Tennessee State University in Murfreesboro, Tennessee, USA
Vol Walker Library at the University of Arkansas in Fayetteville, Arkansas, USA
Walker Library (Minneapolis) in Minneapolis, Minnesota, USA
The Walker Library of the History of Human Imagination, a private library in Ridgefield, Connecticut, USA
Walker Management Library at Vanderbilt University in Nashville, Tennessee, USA
Walker Memorial Library in Westbrook, Maine, USA